Samora Smallwood is a Canadian actress and writer. She won the Canadian Screen Award for Best Lead Actress in a television film or miniseries at the 10th Canadian Screen Awards in 2022 for her performance in the Lifetime television film Death She Wrote (2021).

Career 
Smallwood is a founder of The Actors Work Studio in Toronto. On television, she guest starred on Designated Survivor, The Expanse, Star Trek: Discovery and Murdoch Mysteries. She also had a recurring roles on Hallmark Channel fantasy series Good Witch in 2021, and Oprah Winfrey Network prime time soap opera The Kings of Napa in 2022.

Filmography

Film

Television

References

External links
 
 

Living people
Black Canadian actresses
Canadian television actresses
Canadian film actresses
Canadian Screen Award winners
21st-century Canadian actresses
Year of birth missing (living people)